JBT may refer to:

 JBT Corporation, an American food processing machinery and airport equipment company
 JBT (EP), by the John Butler Trio
 Bethel Seaplane Base (IATA: JBT), in Alaska
 Djeoromitxí language (ISO 639-3: jbt), a nearly extinct language of Brazil
 Jervis Bay Territory, a territory of the Commonwealth of Australia
 John Butler Trio, an Australian roots/rock band